Legislative Assembly elections were held in Sikkim in May 1985 to elect the 32 members of the third Legislative Assembly.

Results

Elected members

References

State Assembly elections in Sikkim
1980s in Sikkim
Sikkim